Gabrje pri Ilovi Gori (in older sources also Malo Gaberje) is a small settlement in the Municipality of Grosuplje in central Slovenia. It lies just west of the village of  Velika Ilova Gora in the historical region of Lower Carniola. The municipality is now included in the Central Slovenia Statistical Region.

Name
The name of the settlement was originally Malo Gabrje, later shortened to Gabrje. The name was changed to Gabrje pri Ilovi Gori in 1955. In the past the German name was Kleingaberje.

References

External links

Gabrje pri Ilovi Gori on Geopedia

Populated places in the Municipality of Grosuplje